John Rowlands (August 14, 1938 – 23 February 2015) was a Welsh language author of several novels including Lle bo'r gwenyn ("Where Bees May Be", 1960). He was also a professor of Welsh literature.

Biography
Born in Trawsfynydd, Merionethshire, Rowlands graduated in Welsh from Bangor University in 1959 and went on to lecture at Abertawe/Swansea, Coleg y Drindod, Caerfyrddin,  Llanbedr Pont Steffan  and Aberystwyth. He retired in 2003 but remained active as an editor, critic and judge. In retirement he worked on creative writing courses at Bangor.

His academic work included editing a major literary series Y Meddwl a'r Dychymyg Cymreig and numerous volumes and papers.  He was one of the most prolific  judges in the Eisteddfod literary competitions and was probably the foremost critic in Welsh on Welsh.  He also contributed a regular column to the magazine Barn and was a wine and restaurant critic.

Works

Novels
Lle bo'r Gwenyn (1960)
Yn ôl i'w Teyrnasoedd (1963)
Ienctid yw 'mhechod (1965)Llawer Is na'r Angylion (1968)Bydded Tywyllwch  (1969)Arch ym Mhrâg  (1972)Tician Tician (1978)

Academic booksPriodas Waed, translation of 'Bodas de Sangre' by Lorca (with R Bryn Williams) (1977)
Writers of Wales, T Rowland Hughes  (1975)
Profiles (with G Jones) (1981)
Cnoi Cil ar Lenyddiaeth (1989)
Ysgrifau ar y Nofel (1992)
Y Meddwl a'r Dychymyg Cymreig - series editor

ReferencesCompanion to Welsh Literature'' (Cydymaith i Lenyddiaeth Cymru). ed. Meic Stephens. University of Wales Press, Cardiff. 1986.

1938 births
2015 deaths
Welsh-speaking academics
Welsh writers
Welsh-language writers
Welsh novelists
British restaurant critics
Alumni of Bangor University
20th-century Welsh novelists
People from Trawsfynydd